Elizabeth Victoria Montgomery (April 15, 1933 – May 18, 1995) was an American actress whose career spanned five decades in film, stage, and television. She is best remembered for her leading role as the witch Samantha Stephens on the television series Bewitched.

The daughter of actor, director and producer Robert Montgomery, she began her career in the 1950s with a role on her father's television series Robert Montgomery Presents, and she won a Theater World Award for her 1956 Broadway debut in the production Late Love. In the 1960s, she became known for her role as Samantha Stephens on the ABC sitcom Bewitched. Her work on the series earned her five Primetime Emmy Award nominations and four Golden Globe Award nominations. After Bewitched ended its run in 1972, Montgomery continued her career with roles in numerous television films, including A Case of Rape (1974), as Ellen Harrod, and The Legend of Lizzie Borden (1975), as Lizzie Borden. Both roles earned her additional Emmy Award nominations.

Throughout her career, Montgomery was involved in various forms of political activism and charitable work.

Early life
Montgomery was born on April 15, 1933, in Los Angeles, California, to Broadway actress Elizabeth Daniel Bryan Allen and film star Robert Montgomery. Montgomery's mother was a native of Kentucky and her father was a native of New York. She had an elder sister who was born in 1931 and died in infancy, Martha Bryan Montgomery (named after her aunt Martha-Bryan Allen) and a younger brother, Robert B. Montgomery Jr. Montgomery was of Irish and Scottish descent. Her great-grandfather, Archibald Montgomery, was born in Belfast and he emigrated to the United States in 1849. Genealogical research which was conducted after her death revealed that she and Lizzie Borden, acquitted of the murder of her father and stepmother in 1893, were sixth cousins once removed, both of them were descended from 17th-century Massachusetts resident John Luther. Montgomery portrayed Borden in the TV movie The Legend of Lizzie Borden (1975), unaware that Borden was her distant cousin.

After attending the Westlake School for Girls in Holmby Hills, California, Montgomery graduated from the Spence School in New York City. She studied at the American Academy of Dramatic Arts in Manhattan for three years.

Career

1951–1963: Early work
Montgomery made her television debut in her father's series Robert Montgomery Presents and later appeared on occasion as a member of his "summer stock" company of performers. In October 1953, Montgomery made her Broadway debut, starring in Late Love, for which she won a Theater World Award for her performance. She then made her film debut in Otto Preminger's The Court-Martial of Billy Mitchell (1955). Montgomery returned to Broadway in 1956, appearing in The Loud Red Patrick.

Montgomery's early career consisted of starring roles and appearances in live television dramas and series, such as Studio One, Kraft Television Theater, Johnny Staccato, Burke's Law, The Twilight Zone, The Eleventh Hour, Wagon Train, Boris Karloff's Thriller, and Alfred Hitchcock Presents. Montgomery was nominated at the 13th Primetime Emmy Awards for her portrayal of southern nightclub performer Rusty Heller in a 1960 episode of The Untouchables, playing opposite David White, who later portrayed Larry Tate in Bewitched. She played the part of Rose Cornelius in the Rawhide episode "Incident at El Crucero" (1963).

Montgomery was featured in a role as a socialite who falls for a gangster (Henry Silva) in Johnny Cool (1963), directed by William Asher, and the film comedy Who's Been Sleeping in My Bed? (also 1963), with Dean Martin and Carol Burnett, this time directed by Daniel Mann. After her appearance on Alfred Hitchcock Presents, Alfred Hitchcock had her in mind to play the sister-in-law of Sean Connery, who sees herself as a rival to the troubled heroine in the movie Marnie (1964), but Montgomery was unavailable.

1964–1972: Bewitched

In the ABC situation comedy Bewitched, Montgomery played the central role of lovable witch Samantha Stephens, with Dick York (and later with Dick Sargent) as her husband. Starting in the second season of the series, she also played the role of Samantha's mischievous cousin, Serena, under the pseudonym Pandora Spocks (a pun on Pandora's Box).

Bewitched became a ratings success (it was, at the time, the highest-rated series ever for the network). The series aired for eight seasons, from 1964 to 1972, and Montgomery received five Emmy and four Golden Globe nominations for her role on Bewitched. Despite low ratings late in the series run, it was renewed for a ninth season to run from fall 1972. However, Montgomery's marriage to Bewitched director William Asher was failing and the couple had separated by the end of the eighth season. 

This caused severe friction in their professional relationship and ended any possibility of another season. As a consolation to ABC, Montgomery and Asher (under their company name Ashmont, which produced Bewitched) offered a half-hour sitcom, The Paul Lynde Show, to the network for the 1972–1973 season. Lynde's series lasted only one year.

In a parody of her Samantha Stephens role, she made a cameo appearance as a witch at the end of the beach party film How to Stuff a Wild Bikini (1965). The film was directed by Asher, her husband at the time. That same year she also provided the voice of Samantha for an episode of the animated series The Flintstones.

1973–1995: Later career
Montgomery returned to Samantha-like twitching of her nose and on-screen magic in a series of Japanese television commercials (1980–83) for "Mother" chocolate biscuits and cookies which were produced by the confectionery conglomerate Lotte Corp. These Japanese commercials provided a substantial salary for Montgomery while she remained out of sight of non-Japanese fans and the Hollywood industry.

In the United States, Montgomery spent much of her later career pursuing dramatic roles that took her as far away from the good-natured Samantha as possible. Among her later roles were performances that brought her Emmy Award nominations: a rape victim in A Case of Rape (1974), and the accused (but acquitted) murderer Lizzie Borden in William Bast's The Legend of Lizzie Borden (1975). After the actress died, Rhonda McClure, a genealogist, discovered that Montgomery and Borden were distant cousins.

Montgomery made many appearances on the game show Password. Allen Ludden, the show's longtime host, called her the "Queen of Password". Montgomery later played a pioneer woman facing hardship in 1820s Ohio in the miniseries The Awakening Land (1978), for which she earned her ninth Emmy nomination.

In A Killing Affair (1977), Montgomery played the role of a police detective who has an affair with her married partner, played by O. J. Simpson. In the television movie Amos (1985), she played a rare villainous role, as a vicious nurse who abuses her wards in a home for senior citizens. The wards are played by Kirk Douglas and Dorothy McGuire, among others. In 1989, Montgomery returned to Broadway one last time in a production of Love Letters, opposite Robert Foxworth. She played one of her last roles in an episode of Batman: The Animated Series entitled "Showdown", in which she played a barmaid; this was also her final work to be screened, since the episode aired posthumously. Her last television series was the highly rated Edna Buchanan detective series – the second and final film of the series received its first airing on May 9, 1995, only nine days before Montgomery died.

Personal life
In 1954, Montgomery married New York City socialite Frederick Gallatin Cammann; the couple divorced less than a year later. She was married to Academy Award winning actor Gig Young from 1956 to 1963 and then she was married to director-producer William Asher from 1963 until their divorce in 1973. They had three children: William, Robert and Rebecca. The latter two pregnancies were incorporated into Bewitched as Samantha's pregnancies. During the eighth year of the show, Montgomery fell in love with director Richard Michaels. Their resulting affair led to the end of both of their marriages, as well as the end of the series. They moved in together when shooting ended in 1972; the relationship lasted two and a half years. On January 28, 1993, she married actor Robert Foxworth, after living with him for nearly twenty years. They remained married until her death in 1995.

According to author Herbie J Pilato, Montgomery had an affair with Alexander Godunov while she was living with Foxworth but was not yet married to him. Godunov was found dead on May 18, 1995, the day Montgomery died, but it is believed that he died several days before Montgomery died.

Throughout the run of Bewitched, many references to Patterson, New York, were made on the series. The Putnam County town was the site of the Montgomery homestead, and it was also the place where she spent her childhood summers. In later years, her mother lived in the family farmhouse on Cushman Road.

Political activism
Montgomery was personally devoted to liberal political causes, and she lent her name, along with a large amount of her time, money, and energy, to a wide variety of charitable and political causes. She was a champion of women's rights, AIDS activism, and gay rights. She was also an ardent critic of the Vietnam War, and in later years, she was an active advocate for AIDS research and outreach to the disabled community. Professionally, she lent her voice as the narrator of two political documentaries which were critical of U.S. foreign policy, Cover Up: Behind the Iran Contra Affair (1988) and its Academy Award-winning sequel The Panama Deception (1992). In June 1992, Montgomery and her former Bewitched co-star and good friend Dick Sargent, were grand marshals at the Los Angeles Gay Pride Parade.

Charitable work
During the last year of her life, Montgomery was a volunteer at the Los Angeles Unit of Learning Ally, a nonprofit organization which records educational books on specially formatted CDs as well as in downloadable formats for disabled people. In 1994, Montgomery produced several radio and television public-service announcements for Learning Ally's Los Angeles unit. In January 1995, she recorded the 1952 edition of the best-selling book of poetry titled When We Were Very Young by A. A. Milne for Learning Ally.

On June 3, 1995, sixteen days after her death, Learning Ally's Los Angeles unit dedicated its 1995 Record-A-Thon to Montgomery and it also secured 21 celebrities to assist in the recording of the book titled Chicken Soup for the Soul, which was also dedicated to her memory.

Illness and death
For several months before her death, Montgomery had struggled with cancer. She had ignored the influenza-like symptoms during the filming of Deadline for Murder: From the Files of Edna Buchanan, which she finished filming in late March 1995. By the time the cancer was diagnosed, it had spread from her colon to her liver, so it was too late for medical intervention.

With no hope of recovery and unwilling to die in a hospital, she chose to return to the Beverly Hills home that she shared with Foxworth. At 8:22 a.m. Pacific time on the morning of May 18, 1995, Montgomery died in her sleep at home, eight weeks after her diagnosis and 33 days after her birthday; she was 62 years old.

On June 18, 1995, exactly one month after her death, a memorial service was held at the Canon Theatre in Beverly Hills. Herbie Hancock played music, and Dominick Dunne spoke about the early years of their friendship when both of them lived in New York City. Other speakers included her widower, Robert Foxworth, who read sympathy cards which were sent to him by fans, her nurse, her brother, her daughter, and her stepson. Her body was cremated at the Westwood Village Memorial Park Cemetery. 

Montgomery kept her parents' home in Patterson, Putnam County, New York. After her death, the estate was sold and then it became a part of Wonder Lake State Park.

Legacy

On April 19, 1998, Montgomery's family held an auction and a sale of her clothing in order to benefit the AIDS Healthcare Foundation of Los Angeles. Erin Murphy, who played Tabitha on the Bewitched television series, modeled the clothing that was auctioned.
In June 2005, a bronze statue of Montgomery as Samantha Stephens was erected in Salem, Massachusetts.
A star on the Hollywood Walk of Fame was presented in honor of Montgomery's work on television on January 4, 2008. The location of the star is 6533 Hollywood Blvd.

Filmography

Film

Television

Stage credits

Narration work

The Panama Deception  (1992)
Craven Street: Ben Franklin in London, a five-part radio drama (1993)
Beauty's Punishment (1994)
Beauty's Release (1994)

Television coverage
In 1998, the A&E Television Network produced a documentary for its Biography television series about the life and career of Elizabeth Montgomery. The documentary first aired on A&E on February 15, 1999.
In 1999, the E! cable channel produced a documentary for its E! The True Hollywood Story series entitled "Bewitched: The E! True Hollywood Story." The documentary first aired on E! on August 22, 1999.

References

Bibliography

External links

1933 births
1995 deaths
Activists from California
Activists from New York (state)
Actresses from Los Angeles
American Academy of Dramatic Arts alumni
American anti-war activists
American film actresses
American people of Irish descent
American people of Scotch-Irish descent
American people of Scottish descent
American stage actresses
American television actresses
American voice actresses
American women's rights activists
Bewitched
Deaths from cancer in California
Deaths from colorectal cancer
Harvard-Westlake School alumni
HIV/AIDS activists
American LGBT rights activists
People from Patterson, New York
Spence School alumni
20th-century American actresses
Burials at Westwood Village Memorial Park Cemetery